Seventeen Seventy, sometimes inaccurately written as 1770 or Town of 1770, is a coastal town and locality in the Gladstone Region, Queensland, Australia.

The town is built on the site of the second landing in Australia by James Cook and the crew of the bark  in May 1770 (and their first landing in what is now the state of Queensland).

Official name
Although the town is referred to locally as 1770 using numerals, the official name of the town is in words Seventeen Seventy, as it is a principle of Queensland's place naming that numbers are spelled out.

Geography
The town is situated on a peninsula, with the Coral Sea and Bustard Bay on three sides.

Seventeen Seventy can be reached by a sealed road from Bundaberg,  to the south, going through Agnes Water (immediately to the south). The town sustains a small permanent population; a significant holiday population makes it to the area to take advantage of fishing, Great Barrier Reef trips and other water activities.

The northern tip of the peninsula is mostly with the protected area of Joseph Banks (Round Hill Head) Conservation Park.

Seventeen Seventy has the following headlands:

 Monument Point
 Round Hill Head

Monument Point is named because of the monument erected there to commemorate the landing by James Cook on 23 May 1770.

Offshore from Seventeen Seventy is:

 Bustard Bay
 the Fairfax Islands group
 the Hoskyn Islands group
 the Bunker Group of islands
 Capricorn Channel
 Curtis Channel

History
Originally known as Round Hill – after the creek it sits on – the name was changed on 24 June 1936 after the town allotments were surveyed in 1935 to recognise the historical importance of the town.

At the  the town of Seventeen Seventy had a population of 76 people.

In the  the locality of Seventeen Seventy had a population of 69 people.

Tourism
The village is a tourist destination on Queensland's Discovery Coast. The village itself contains holiday accommodation, restaurants, general store, hotel, picnic areas with free barbecues and a small marina where daily trips depart for Lady Musgrave Island on the Great Barrier Reef, and several trips a week to Bustard Head Light Station.

The area's wildlife and vegetation have been preserved as far as possible, and this, together with the area's natural environment, and an outer surf and inner still water beach, is a tourist attraction. There are also day cruises and flights to the outer Great Barrier Reef, to nearby Lady Musgrave Island and Pancake Creek, and the nearby Bustard Head lighthouse.

The local tourism and commerce organisation responsible for promoting the region is Discovery Coast Tourism and Commerce.

Heritage listings

Seventeen Seventy has a number of heritage-listed sites, including:
 Round Hill Creek and Round Hill Head: Cook's Landing Place

Amenities 
There is a boat ramp with pontoon on Captain Cook Drive at Round Hill Creek. It is managed by the Gladstone Regional Council.

There is a heliport on Captain Cook Drive. It is adjacent to the Agnes Water/1770 SES Facility.

Events 
The community of Seventeen Seventy hold the re-enactment of this historic landing each year as part of the 1770 Festival held in May.

Attractions 
There are two lookouts on the northern tip of the peninsula:

 Joseph Banks Lower Lookout.
 Joseph Banks Top Lookout.

See also

 List of places with numeric names

References

External links

 

Coastal towns in Queensland
Gladstone Region
Localities in Queensland